Eishun, frequently written as 「永春」("everlasting spring") in Japanese, is the name of a number of Japanese painters:

 Eishun, 15th century yamato-e painter
 Kanō Eishun, 18th century Kanō school painter
 Baiōken Eishun, 18th century ukiyo-e painter and print artist
 Eishun Toshiyasu, active c. 1926-1945

Japanese masculine given names